Impact Assessment and Project Appraisal is a scientific journal in the area of impact assessment, published by Taylor and Francis. The journal is associated with the organization International Association for Impact Assessment. It is edited by Thomas Fischer from University of Liverpool.

The journal is a continuation of Impact Assessment (1982–1997) and Project Appraisal (1986–1997).

Abstracting and indexing
The journal is indexed and abstracted in the following bibliographic databases:

According to the Journal Citation Reports, the journal has a 2019 impact factor of 1.551.

References

External links

English-language journals
Publications established in 1982
Bimonthly journals